Iresine heterophylla, or Standley's bloodleaf, is a plant species native to the southwestern United States and also to Mexico. It has been collected from Arizona, New Mexico, Texas, Chihuahua, Sonora, Durango, Coahuila, Nuevo León, Campeche and Tabasco.

Iresine heterophylla is a perennial herb up to 100 cm tall. Leaves are opposite, ovate, up to 6 cm long. Flowers are arranged in a rather large, branching panicle up to 40 cm long. Flowers are small, white to straw-colored, up to 4 cm across, covered in dense woolly hairs. Fruits are green, egg-shaped, usually less than 1 mm across, enclosed inside the persistent flower parts which are in turn enclosed in woolly hairs, so that the infructescence as a whole appears white and woolly.

References

heterophylla
Flora of Nuevo León
Flora of Durango
Flora of Texas
Flora of Coahuila
Flora of Sonora
Flora of Arizona
Flora of Campeche
Flora of New Mexico
Flora of Tabasco